The 2013–14 Latvian Basketball League is the 23rd season. It is currently sponsored by Aldaris and thus officially known as the Aldaris Latvijas Basketbola līga. The season began on 1 October 2013 and ended on 19 May 2014.

Participants 

VEF Rīga
BK Ventspils
Liepāja/Triobet
BK Valmiera
BK Jelgava
Jūrmala/Fēnikss
BK Jēkabpils
Latvijas Universitāte
BA Turība
Barons kvartāls
BK Saldus
LMT BA

Regular season

Playoffs

Awards

See also
2013–14 VTB United League
2013–14 Baltic Basketball League

References

External links
Official website

Latvijas Basketbola līga
Latvian